Samrang Gewog (Dzongkha: བསམ་རང་) is a gewog (village block) of Samdrup Jongkhar District, Bhutan. They also comprise part of Bhangtar Dungkhag, along with Martshala Gewog.

References

Gewogs of Bhutan
Samdrup Jongkhar District